Fréquence Banane is the student radio of EPFL and the University of Lausanne based in Ecublens/Switzerland. It is a non-commercial community radio station member of UNIKOM-Radios.

Community radio stations
French-language radio stations in Switzerland
Radio stations established in 1993